Jodi Dannatt (born 26 April 1971 in Sunshine, Victoria) is an Australian former cricket player. She played domestic cricket for the Queensland Women's cricket team between 1993 and 2000. Dannatt played ten One Day Internationals for the Australia national women's cricket team.

References

External links
 Jodie Dannatt at CricketArchive
 Jodie Dannatt at southernstars.org.au

Living people
1971 births
Australia women One Day International cricketers
Cricketers from Melbourne
People from Sunshine, Victoria
Queensland Fire cricketers